The second round of the qualification tournament for the 2022 FIFA World Cup from UEFA (also known as the UEFA play-offs) was contested by twelve teams from the UEFA segment of qualifying. The play-offs determined the final three European teams that joined the group winners at the World Cup in Qatar. The ten runners-up from the UEFA first round groups participated in the play-offs, along with two group winners from the 2020–21 UEFA Nations League. The teams were divided into three paths, each containing four teams, with each play-off path featuring two single-leg semi-finals, and one single-leg final. The matches took place in March and June 2022.

Format
The qualification format was confirmed by the UEFA Executive Committee during their meeting in Nyon, Switzerland on 4 December 2019. The play-offs depended, in part, on results from the 2020–21 UEFA Nations League, although to a lesser degree than play-offs of the UEFA Euro 2020 qualifying tournament.

Unlike previous editions, the play-offs were not contested in two-legged ties. Instead, the twelve teams were split into three play-off paths, each containing four teams. Each play-off path was planned to feature two single-leg semi-finals on 24 March, and one single-leg final on 29 March 2022. The winners of the final in each play-off path qualified for the 2022 FIFA World Cup in Qatar. The semi-finals were hosted by the six best-ranked runners-up of the qualifying group stage, while the host of the final was determined by a draw.

The play-offs were played in single-leg knockout matches. If scores were level at the end of normal time, 30 minutes of extra time would be played, where each team was allowed to make a sixth substitution. If the scores remained tied, a penalty shoot-out would be used to determine the winner. Following approval from the UEFA Executive Committee in December 2019, the use of the video assistant referee system was approved for the entire World Cup qualification tournament.

Qualified teams
Twelve teams advanced to the play-offs. Unlike previous editions, all participants were not decided solely on the results of the first round. Two of the twelve spots were allocated to group winners of the 2020–21 edition of the UEFA Nations League.

Second-placed teams (all ten advanced)
The ten runners-up from the UEFA first round advanced to the play-offs. Based on the results from the qualifying group stage, the six best-ranked teams were seeded, while the bottom four were unseeded in the semi-final draw.

Nations League group winners (best two advanced)
Based on the 2020–21 UEFA Nations League overall ranking, the best two Nations League group winners that finished outside the top two of their qualifying group advanced to the play-offs and were unseeded in the semi-final draw.

Key
 Team qualified directly for World Cup as qualifying group winner
 Team advanced to the play-offs as qualifying group runner-up
 Team (in bold) advanced to the play-offs as one of the best two Nations League group winners outside top two of their qualifying group

Draw

Following the completion of the UEFA first round, the twelve teams that advanced to the play-offs were drawn into three paths of four teams on 26 November 2021, 17:00 CET, in Zürich, Switzerland. The following procedure was applied in the draw:
 The six seeded teams were allocated to semi-finals 1 to 6 as the host team in the order drawn.
 The six unseeded teams were allocated to semi-finals 1 to 6 as the away team in the order drawn.
 Play-off Path A was formed by semi-finals 1 and 2, with the winners of both semi-finals advancing to final A.
 Play-off Path B was formed by semi-finals 3 and 4, with the winners of both semi-finals advancing to final B.
 Play-off Path C was formed by semi-finals 5 and 6, with the winners of both semi-finals advancing to final C.
 The semi-final winners that host play-off finals A, B and C were decided by a draw.

For political reasons related to the Russo-Ukrainian War, Russia and Ukraine could not be drawn into the same play-off path. Armenia / Azerbaijan, Gibraltar / Spain, Kosovo / Bosnia and Herzegovina, Kosovo / Serbia and Kosovo / Russia were also identified as prohibited clashes, but among these teams only Russia advanced to the play-offs.

The six runners-up with the best group stage performance were seeded in the semi-final draw, while the remaining four runners-up and two teams advancing via the Nations League were unseeded. The seedings were as follows:

Effects of the Russian invasion of Ukraine
Paths A and B were affected by the 2022 Russian invasion of Ukraine which began on 24 February, a month before the semi-finals.

FIFA suspended Russia on 28 February, and announced on 8 March that their semi-final opponents Poland received a bye to the Path B final; a request by the Russian Football Union for a temporary lift of the ban was rejected by the Court of Arbitration for Sport on 18 March. An initial decision by FIFA on 27 February had ruled that Russia had to compete under the name "Football Union of Russia" (RFU) and without its flag or anthem, and play its home matches on neutral ground without spectators. By that point, the football associations of the other three teams in the Path (Czech Republic, Poland, and Sweden) had refused to play any matches against Russia, regardless of location, a stance to which they remained committed following FIFA's initial decision.

In Path A, following a request by the Ukrainian Association of Football, on 8 March FIFA postponed the semi-final between Scotland and Ukraine until June 2022, along with the path final. In the interest of preventing further fixture congestion, the other semi-final match between Wales and Austria would go ahead as scheduled in March.

Schedule
Four of the semi-final matches took place on 24 March, and two of the final matches on 29 March 2022. In Path A, one semi-final and the final were postponed to 1 and 5 June 2022, respectively, due to the Russian invasion of Ukraine. The kick-off times were confirmed on 26 November 2021 following the draw. As part of UEFA's scheduling, the losing semi-finalists of each path played a friendly match against each other on the day of the play-off finals.

Times are CET/CEST, as listed by UEFA (local times, if different, are in parentheses).

Path A

Bracket

Summary

|-
| colspan="3" style="text-align:center; background:whitesmoke;" | Semi-finals

|-
| colspan="3" style="text-align:center; background:whitesmoke;" | Final

Semi-finals

Final

Path B

Bracket

Summary

|-
| colspan="3" style="text-align:center; background:whitesmoke;" | Semi-finals

|-
| colspan="3" style="text-align:center; background:whitesmoke;" | Final

Semi-finals

Poland advanced on walkover.

Final

Path C

Bracket

Summary

|-
| colspan="3" style="text-align:center; background:whitesmoke;" | Semi-finals

|-
| colspan="3" style="text-align:center; background:whitesmoke;" | Final

Semi-finals

Final

Goalscorers

Discipline
A player was automatically suspended for the next match for the following offences:
 Receiving a red card (red card suspensions could be extended for serious offences)
 Receiving two yellow cards in two different qualifying group stage matches (yellow card suspensions were carried forward to the play-off semi-finals, but not the play-off finals, World Cup final tournament or any other future international matches)

On 17 January 2022, following a UEFA request, FIFA announced the expiration of yellow cards received during the qualifying group stage, thus preventing suspensions in the play-off finals due to yellow cards received in the semi-finals. However, yellow card suspensions accumulated at the end of the qualifying group stage were still carried forward to the play-offs.

The following suspensions were served during the second round qualifying matches:

Prior to their suspension, Russia were to serve the following suspensions in their semi-final:

Notes

References

External links

Qualifiers – Europe, FIFA.com
European Qualifiers, UEFA.com

Play-off
FIFA
FIFA
2021–22 in Austrian football
2021–22 in Czech football
2021–22 in Italian football
2021–22 in North Macedonia football
2021–22 in Polish football
Poland at the 2022 FIFA World Cup
2021–22 in Portuguese football
Portugal at the 2022 FIFA World Cup
2021–22 in Scottish football
2022 in Swedish football
2021–22 in Turkish football
2021–22 in Ukrainian football
2021–22 in Welsh football
Wales at the 2022 FIFA World Cup
Sports events affected by the 2022 Russian invasion of Ukraine